Gosal is a village in Shaheed Bhagat Singh Nagar district of Punjab State, India. The village is administrated by Sarpanch an elected representative of the village.

Demography 
As of 2011, Gosal has a total number of 196 houses and population of 904 of which 462 include are males while 442 are females according to the report published by Census India in 2011. The literacy rate of Gosal is 77.21%, higher than the state average of 75.84%. The population of children under the age of 6 years is 88 which is 9.73% of total population of Gosal, and child sex ratio is approximately 1047 as compared to Punjab state average of 846.

Most of the people are from Schedule Caste which constitutes 63.16% of total population in Gosal. The town does not have any Schedule Tribe population so far.

As per the report published by Census India in 2011, 276 people were engaged in work activities out of the total population of Gosal which includes 249 males and 27 females. According to census survey report 2011, 95.65% workers describe their work as main work and 4.35% workers are involved in Marginal activity providing livelihood for less than 6 months.

Education 
The village has a Punjabi medium, co-ed primary school. The schools does not provide mid-day meal. The school provide free education to children between the ages of 6 and 14 as per Right of Children to Free and Compulsory Education Act. Amardeep Singh Shergill Memorial college Mukandpur and Sikh National College Banga are the nearest colleges.

Transport 

See also 
List of villages in India

References

External links 
 Tourism of Punjab
 Census of Punjab
 Locality Based PINCode

Villages in Shaheed Bhagat Singh Nagar district